Kawai (written 川井, 川合, 川相, 河井, 河合, 河相 or 可愛) is both a Japanese surname and feminine Japanese given name. Notable people with the name include:

Surname 

, Japanese television and theater actress
, Japanese ice dancer
, Japanese footballer
, Japanese actress and voice actress
, Japanese singer
, Japanese Jungian psychologist
, Japanese professional golfer
, Japanese violinist and composer
, Japanese Paralympic swimmer
, Japanese potter
, Japanese educator, Christian activist, and proponent of Japanese-Western ties before, during, and after World War II
, Japanese actress
, Japanese table tennis player
, Japanese music composer
, former Japanese football player
, former Japanese Nippon Professional Baseball infielder
, Japanese primatologist
, Japanese artist
Reishin Kawai (1931–2010), 8th dan aikido practitioner and acupuncturist
, Japanese sport wrestler
, the creator of the anime television show Hamtaro
, Japanese football player
, Japanese volleyball player, announcer and television personality
, former Japanese singer
, Japanese Nippon Professional Baseball pitcher
, Japanese politician
, Japanese diplomat and writer
, Japanese sport wrestler
, Japanese footballer
, Japanese stunt man and actor
, Japanese short track speed skater
, Japanese politician
, Japanese voice actor
, Japanese football player
, Japanese baseball player
, Japanese volleyball player
, Japanese actress

Fictional characters
Maria Kawai, a character in the manga series A Devil and Her Love Song
Yumeko Kawai is a character from series Ninja Hattori
Yukari Kawai is a teenage character of main character's older brother's friend from Obake no Q-taro

Given name 

Kawai Okada (born 1948), Japanese former actress and businesswoman

See also
Kawhi

Japanese-language surnames
Japanese feminine given names